Katz v. United States, 389 U.S. 347 (1967), was a landmark decision of the U.S. Supreme Court in which the Court redefined what constitutes a "search" or "seizure" with regard to the protections of the Fourth Amendment to the U.S. Constitution. The ruling expanded the Fourth Amendment's protections from an individual's "persons, houses, papers, and effects", as specified in the Constitution's text, to include any areas where a person has a "reasonable expectation of privacy". The reasonable expectation of privacy standard, known as the Katz test, was formulated in a concurring opinion by Justice John Marshall Harlan II. 

The Katz test has since been used in numerous cases, particularly because of technological advances that create new questions about privacy norms and government surveillance of personal data.

Background
Charles Katz was a sports bettor who by the mid-1960s had become "probably the preeminent college basketball handicapper in America." In 1965, Katz regularly used a public telephone booth near his apartment on Sunset Boulevard in Los Angeles to communicate his gambling handicaps to bookmakers in Boston and Miami. Unbeknownst to Katz, the FBI had begun investigating his gambling activities and was recording his conversations via a covert listening device attached to the outside of the phone booth. After recording many of his phone calls, FBI agents arrested Katz and charged him with eight counts of knowingly transmitting wagering information by telephone between U.S. states, which is a federal crime under Section 18 of the United States Code, particularly a law on the transmission of wagering information.

Katz was tried in the U.S. District Court for the Southern District of California. Katz made a motion to suppress the FBI's recordings, arguing that because the agents did not have a search warrant allowing them to place their listening device, the recordings had been made in violation of the Fourth Amendment and should be inadmissible in court per the exclusionary rule. The judge denied Katz's motion and ruled that the recordings were admissible as evidence, and Katz was convicted based on them. 

Katz appealed his conviction to the U.S. Court of Appeals for the Ninth Circuit. In 1966, the Ninth Circuit affirmed Katz's conviction, ruling that because the FBI's eavesdropping device did not physically penetrate the telephone booth's wall, no Fourth Amendment search occurred, and so the FBI did not need a warrant to place the device. Katz then appealed to the Supreme Court, which agreed to hear his case and granted certiorari.

Opinion of the court
On December 18, 1967, the Supreme Court issued a 7–1 decision in favor of Katz that invalidated the FBI's wiretap evidence and overturned Katz's criminal conviction.
The majority opinion was written by Justice Potter Stewart. The Court began by dismissing the parties' characterization of the case in terms of traditional trespass-based analysis that hinged on, first, whether the public telephone booth Katz had used was a "constitutionally protected area" where he had a "right of privacy"; and second, on whether the FBI had "physically penetrated" the protected area and thus violated the Fourth Amendment. Instead, the Court viewed the situation through the lens of how Katz's use of the phone booth would be perceived by himself and then objectively by others. In a now well-known passage, Stewart wrote:

The Supreme Court then briefly surveyed the history of American jurisprudence on governmental searches and seizures. It described how American courts had traditionally analyzed Fourth Amendment searches by analogizing them to the long-established doctrine of trespass. In their legal briefs, the parties had focused on the 1928 precedent Olmstead v. United States, in which the Court ruled that surveillance by wiretap without any trespass did not constitute a "search" for Fourth Amendment purposes. However, the Court stated that in later cases it had begun recognizing that the Fourth Amendment applied to recorded speech obtained without any physical trespassing, and that the law had evolved. Stewart wrote:

Stewart then concluded the Court's opinion by ruling that even though the FBI knew there was a "strong probability" that Katz was breaking the law when using the phone booth, their use of the wiretap was an unconstitutional search because they did not obtain a warrant before placing the listening device.

Harlan's concurrence

Justice John Marshall Harlan II's concurring opinion in Katz has become even more influential than the majority opinion. It describes a two-part test which has come to be known as the Katz test.

Harlan began his opinion by noting that he was writing separately to elaborate on the meaning of Stewart's majority opinion. Harlan explained that he interpreted Stewart's statements that "the Fourth Amendment protects people, not places" and "what a person knowingly exposes to the public [...] is not a subject of Fourth Amendment protection" to mean that the Fourth Amendment is activated any time a person has an expectation of privacy that is both subjective and objectively reasonable in the eyes of society at large. He summarized his view of the law as comprising a two-part test:

The Supreme Court adopted Harlan's two-part test as a formulation of the Fourth Amendment search analysis for most subsequent cases involving governmental searches that generated constitutional challenges.

Black's dissent
Justice Hugo Black was the only dissenter in the decision. He argued that the Fourth Amendment was only meant to protect "things" from physical search and seizure, and was not meant to protect personal privacy. Additionally, Black argued that the modern act of wiretapping was analogous to the act of eavesdropping, which was around even when the Bill of Rights was drafted. Black concluded that if the drafters of the Fourth Amendment had meant for it to protect against eavesdropping they would have included the proper language.

Impact and legacy
The Supreme Court's decision in Katz significantly expanded the scope of the Fourth Amendment's protections, and represented an unprecedented shift in American search and seizure jurisprudence. Many law enforcement practices that previously were not "within the view" of the Fourth Amendmentsuch as wiretaps on public phone wiresare now covered by the Fourth Amendment and cannot be conducted without first obtaining a search warrant. The Katz precedent continues to be consulted regularly in relation to disputes over modern electronic surveillance by the National Security Agency and law enforcement entities, though with some concerns that the Katz test is becoming outdated due to modern surveillance technologies. 

However, Katz also created significantly more uncertainty surrounding the application of the Fourth Amendment. The Katz test of an objective "reasonable expectation of privacy", which has been widely adopted by U.S. courts, has proven much more difficult to apply than the traditional analysis of whether a physical intrusion into "persons, houses, papers, and effects" occurred. In a 2007 Stanford Law Review article, the American legal scholar Orin Kerr described the scholarly consensus that the Katz test has been a failure:

See also

List of United States Supreme Court cases, volume 389

Notes

References

Works cited

External links

 
 Katz v. United States from C-SPAN's Landmark Cases: Historic Supreme Court Decisions

1967 in United States case law
20th-century American trials
Gambling in the United States
History of Los Angeles
Privacy of telecommunications
Public phones
Search and seizure case law
United States Fourth Amendment case law
United States privacy case law
United States Supreme Court cases of the Warren Court
United States Supreme Court cases
United States Supreme Court decisions that overrule a prior Supreme Court decision